Barry Robert Pepper (born April 4, 1970) is a Canadian actor. He played Private Daniel Jackson in Saving Private Ryan (1998), Corrections Officer Dean Stanton in The Green Mile (1999), Roger Maris in 61* (2001), Joseph L. Galloway in We Were Soldiers (2002), Sergeant Michael Strank in Flags of Our Fathers (2006), Vince in Maze Runner: The Scorch Trials (2015) and Maze Runner: The Death Cure (2018), Lucky Ned Pepper in the remake of the western True Grit (2010) and David Keller in Crawl (2019). He has been nominated for three Screen Actors Guild Awards and a Golden Globe Award. For his role as Robert F. Kennedy in the miniseries The Kennedys (2011), Pepper won the Primetime Emmy Award for Outstanding Lead Actor in a Limited or Anthology Series or Movie.

Early life and education 
Pepper was born the youngest of three boys in Campbell River, British Columbia, the son of a lumberjack. When he was five years old, his family set sail in a homemade yacht, navigating through the South Pacific islands for five years. He was educated through correspondence courses and public schools in Polynesia. His family encouraged him to entertain himself through improvisation and acting games while aboard the ship. When the family had finished their travels, they returned to Canada, settling on Denman Island, which his mother's family had called home for five generations. He graduated from Georges P. Vanier Secondary School in 1988. Pepper attended Camosun College after receiving a scholarship for artistic achievement, studying marketing and design. He later moved to Vancouver, where he enrolled in acting classes. He spent four years studying, including at the Gastown Actors Studio, before landing a recurring role on the show Madison.

Career 
Pepper is perhaps best known for his role as the sniper Private Daniel Jackson in Saving Private Ryan. He portrayed Corrections Officer Dean Stanton in The Green Mile, appeared as Frank Slaughtery in Spike Lee's 25th Hour, as journalist Joseph L. Galloway in We Were Soldiers, his role as the heroic antagonist of the film Battlefield Earth, his depiction of Roger Maris in Billy Crystal's HBO film 61*, as Dale Earnhardt in the ESPN produced film 3: The Dale Earnhardt Story, and as Dan Morris in the film Seven Pounds, with Will Smith. He recently had roles in Casino Jack and the Coen brothers' True Grit. Pepper provided the voice for Alex Mercer, the protagonist of the video game Prototype and the voice for Corporal Dunn, a character in the video game Call of Duty: Modern Warfare 2.

Pepper won the Golden Raspberry Award for Worst Supporting Actor for his performance in Battlefield Earth: A Saga of the Year 3000. He has stated that, had he known in advance he was going to win the award, he would have gladly accepted it in person. He also appeared in Jagged Edge's music video for "Goodbye". In 2011, he starred as Robert F. Kennedy in the Canadian-American TV mini-series The Kennedys, for which he won the Primetime Emmy Award for Outstanding Lead Actor in a Limited or Anthology Series or Movie.

In 2015, Pepper appeared in The Maze Runner sequel, Maze Runner: The Scorch Trials, as Vince, "a survivalist who is one of the last remaining soldiers of a legendary unit called the Right Arm". In 2018, Pepper reprised his role as Vince in Maze Runner: The Death Cure.

In 2019, Pepper starred as Dave Keller in the horror film Crawl.

Personal life 
Pepper is a naturalized United States citizen. He has one child, a daughter, with his wife Cindy.

Filmography

Film

Television

Video games

Awards and nominations

References

External links
 
 

1970 births
Living people
20th-century American male actors
20th-century Canadian male actors
21st-century American male actors
21st-century Canadian male actors
American male film actors
American male television actors
American male video game actors
American male voice actors
American people of Canadian descent
Camosun College alumni
Canadian expatriates in the United States
Canadian male film actors
Canadian male television actors
Canadian male video game actors
Canadian male voice actors
Canadian Screen Award winners
Male actors from British Columbia
Naturalized citizens of the United States
Outstanding Performance by a Lead Actor in a Miniseries or Movie Primetime Emmy Award winners
People from Campbell River, British Columbia
People from the Comox Valley Regional District